Washington Irving High School is a public secondary school located in Clarksburg, West Virginia. The school operated as a high school from 1914 until 1995; since 1996, it has operated as a middle school, housing grades 6 thru 8.

Better known as WI, the school's mascot is the Hilltopper. The school's colors are blue and gold. The school is named after Washington Irving, a 19th-century American author and historian.

History
When WI first opened in 1914, it was an all White school; it continued to be segregated until the 1956, when the end of segregation resulted in the permanent closure of Kelly Miller High School, which was Clarksburg's black school for the duration.

Notable WIHS alumni include ESPN broadcaster Mike Patrick; Putnam Investments CEO Bob Reynolds; and Sam Ellis, the former manager for singer Meat Loaf.

References

Educational institutions established in 1914
Defunct schools in West Virginia
Schools in Harrison County, West Virginia
Buildings and structures in Clarksburg, West Virginia
1914 establishments in West Virginia